General elections were held in San Marino on 16 September 1951. The Sammarinese Christian Democratic Party emerged as the largest single party, winning 26 of the 60 seats in the Grand and General Council. However, the Committee of Freedom alliance held a majority of 31 seats.

Electoral system
Voters had to be citizens of San Marino, male and at least 24 years old.

Results

References

San Marino
General elections in San Marino
1951 in San Marino
San Marino